Edwina Pettway (born 1950) is an American artist. She is associated with the Gee's Bend quilting collective. She learned to quilt from her mother, Candis Pettway, alongside her sisters Qunnie Pettway and Sally Mae Pettway. Her quilts are known for mixing the Gee's Bend tradition with "the pop excesses of Hollywood and Las Vegas."

Life 
Coming from a long matrilineage of quilters, Dinah Miller is Edwina Pettway's great-grandmother.

References 

American quilters
1950 births
Living people
African-American women artists
21st-century American artists
21st-century African-American people
21st-century African-American women
20th-century African-American people
20th-century African-American women